Below is a list of songs that topped the RIM charts in 2021 according to the Recording Industry Association of Malaysia.

Chart history

Footnote

References

External links
Recording Industry Association of Malaysia

2021 in Malaysia
Malaysia
2021